Michael B. Percy is an academic and former politician in Alberta, Canada.

Percy, an economics professor at the University of Alberta, was elected as an Alberta Liberal Party member in Edmonton-Whitemud after former MLA Percy Wickman switched to a new riding. Percy held the riding for one term, serving as Finance Critic until retiring from elected life in 1997.  At that point, he was appointed as the Stanley A. Milner Professor and Dean of the Alberta School of Business at the University of Alberta, a position he held until July 1, 2011.

In 2019, Percy was named a member of the Blue Ribbon Panel on Alberta’s Finances by Alberta Premier Jason Kenney. The final report outlined 26 recommendations to improve Alberta's finances.

Percy is married to Debby Carlson who was also a Liberal member in the Legislative Assembly at that time.

References

External links
Michael Percy biography for the Alberta School of Business, University of Alberta
Michael Percy biography for the Institute of Public Economics at the University of Alberta

Living people
Alberta Liberal Party MLAs
Academic staff of the University of Alberta
Year of birth missing (living people)